The 1976–77 Providence Friars men's basketball team represented Providence College during the 1976–77 NCAA Division I men's basketball season.

Senior Guard Joe Hassett was the team's captain and leading scorer, averaging 18.8 points per game. Junior Forward Bruce Campbell with 8.1 rebounds.

The Friars would receive an at-large bid into the NCAA Tournament where they would fall in the first round to Kansas State.

Schedule

Team players drafted into the NBA
1977 NBA draft

References 

Providence Friars men's basketball seasons
1976 in sports in Rhode Island
1977 in sports in Rhode Island
Providence
Providence